Golob is a surname which means "pigeon" or "dove" in Slovenian. Notable people with the surname include:

 Alissa Golob, Canadian anti-abortion activist
 Berta Golob (born 1932), Slovene writer
 Jani Golob (born 1948), Slovenian musician
 Julie Golob, American markswoman
 Lana Golob (born 1999), Slovenian footballer
 Mariša Golob (born 1990), Slovenian powerlifter
 Miha Golob (born 1980), Slovenian footballer
 Natalija Golob (born 1986), Slovenian footballer
 Robert Golob (born 1967), Slovenian businessman and politician
 Rok Golob (born 1975), Slovenian musician
 Sacha Golob (born 1981), British philosopher
 Saša Golob (born 1991), Slovenian gymnast
 Tadej Golob (born 1967), Slovenian mountaineer and writer
 Vinko Golob (1921–1995), Bosnian footballer

See also
 
 Gollob

Slovene-language surnames